Dede is the art name of an Israeli graffiti artist who began displaying works on the streets of Tel Aviv in 2006. Also known as Dede Bandaid, Dede’s work is well known for his widespread use of images of band-aids.

Biography
Dede was born and raised in Tel Aviv, Israel. He was first exposed to graffiti art in his youth and at the age of 13 spray-painted a map of the Milky Way galaxy on the walls of his school.
During his military service in the Israel Defense Forces, Dede began doing graffiti which included visual messages that were implicitly anti-establishment. These included childlike soldiers making soap bubbles, as well as policemen wearing ballerina outfits. After his release from the army,  Dede often sprayed stencils of peace doves, large mutant animals, architecture etc. as a way of communicating social and political ideas.

Finding inspiration in current day issues, Dede began, in 2008, to reflect on contemporary events in Israel. Such were 2011 Israeli social justice protests, the Israeli housing crisis, Crony capitalism and homelessness.

Dede’s works are mostly displayed in the public realm though he avoids pure acts of vandalism. Dede began displaying his work in Israeli galleries and museums in 2009 including Kishon Gallery, Alfred Gallery, P8, Tzadik Gallery, Zemack Gallery, Fresh Paint Art Fair, Ein-Hod Museum, Haifa Museum and more. He has also shown in galleries in Switzerland, Italy, France, New York, Germany and others.

Work
Dede’s early work entailed widespread stencil use. He has evolved in his style to free-style drawing and wheat pasting. A recurring theme in his work is the band-aid. The reason for Dede’s repeated use of the band-aid is unclear, and the artist himself has avoided giving it a precise meaning.

Dede gained much public attention for using large-scale elements in the public arena, turning them to iconic pieces of art, as if pointing at a relevant social or current affair for the public to pay attention to. Such examples were turning one of the Ayalon Highway intersections into a Yellow Submarine (album); turning an abandoned part of bridge into a cloth-pin; and turning a big empty parking lot into a missile target during the 2014 Israel-Gaza conflict.
One of Dede's unique artworks which has attracted special attention was at the abandoned Dulphinarium in Tel-Aviv, notoriously known for the Dolphinarium discotheque suicide bombing, turning the sea-facing front of the structure into a Chattery Teeth, possibly being the biggest illegal piece of art in Israel.

Gallery

See also 
 Jewish culture
 Street Art
 Florentine, Tel Aviv
 Banksy
 C215 (street artist)
 List of urban artists

Bibliography 
 Rojo, Jaime, and Harrigton, Steven. "The New Face of Tel Aviv Street Art", Huffington Post, 24/4/2013. 
 Briggs, Gemma. "If Walls Could Talk", Time Out Israel, August 2011. 
 Lanir, Tal (Ed.), "Street Art Israel", Tel Aviv Museum of Art, 2011.
 Merom, Hagai, "Tel Aviv's Graffiti Underground", Halfi Publishing House, Tel Aviv, 2011

References

External links 

Living people
Street artists
Bezalel Academy of Arts and Design alumni
Israeli artists
Pseudonymous artists
Year of birth missing (living people)